Półgrosz (półgroszek, lit. half-grosz) was a silver and later copper coin worth ½ of grosz and 9 denars, minted in Poland, Lithuania and Silesia. Polish silver półgrosz weighing 1-1,7g was minted mainly from c.1367 to 1526 and occasionally from 1580 to 1792, from 1765 coin was minted in copper. Lithuanian silver półgrosz weighing c.1,3g was minted in 1495–1566.

References

Coins of Poland
Silver coins
Copper coins